Jason William Dohring (born March 30, 1982) is an American stage, television and voice actor who is best known for his role as Logan Echolls on the television show Veronica Mars (2004–2007, 2019) and the 2014 film continuation as well as his roles as Josef Kostan on Moonlight (2007), Adam Carpenter on Ringer (2011), Detective Will Kinney on The Originals (2013) and Chase Graves on iZombie (2015).  He is also known as the voice of Terra, one of the main protagonists of the Kingdom Hearts franchise (2010–2019).

Career
Dohring appeared as main character Logan Echolls in Veronica Mars between 2004 and 2007. After its cancellation, Dohring found work with Warner Bros. and CBS, co-starring in the television series Moonlight. He played the vampire Josef Kostan, a mischievous 400-year-old hedge-fund trader.

In October 2008, it was announced that Jason would return to TV as Spencer, a senior legislative assistant, on the HBO comedy series Washingtonienne.

On February 10, 2010, in an interview he stated that he would be voicing a character in a Disney video game that was released in Japan last January; the game was revealed to be Kingdom Hearts Birth by Sleep by Square-Enix/Disney, and the character was Terra. He reprised the role in a cameo appearance in Kingdom Hearts 3D: Dream Drop Distance and for the character's full return in Kingdom Hearts III. In May 2010, Dohring began work on the Andrew Disney feature film Searching for Sonny, produced by Red Productions. Jason will be playing the role of Elliot Knight.

In 2011, Dohring appeared on The CW's series Ringer co-starring Sarah Michelle Gellar. In 2012, Dohring made a guest appearance on the TV show Supernatural as the time god Chronos.

In April 2013, it was announced that Dohring had been cast in the Veronica Mars movie. He was also cast in The CW's science fiction drama The Tomorrow People in a guest role.

In 2014, Dohring co-narrated the audio book The Mortal Instruments: City of Heavenly Fire by Cassandra Clare with actress Sophie Turner.

From 2015 to 2016, Dohring had a recurring role in The CW series The Originals as Detective Will Kinney. In October 2016, Dohring was cast in a recurring role as Chase Graves on The CW's iZombie.

In March 2021, Dohring was cast in the "heavily recurring" role of Lieutenant Commander Whitshaw in the CBS series SEAL Team starring David Boreanaz.

Personal life
Dohring married Lauren Kutner in 2004. They have four children. Dohring is a Scientologist and has credited Scientology for his understanding of acting and career professionalism. His father is the millionaire Doug Dohring.

Filmography

Film

Television

Video games

Audiobooks

References

External links

Jason Dohring cast bio on The CW
Jason Dohring interview on Television Without Pity

1982 births
American male child actors
American male film actors
American male television actors
American male video game actors
Living people
Male actors from Toledo, Ohio
Male actors from Ohio
20th-century American male actors
21st-century American male actors
American Scientologists